InDnegev is a music and art festival in the Negev.

History
The festival was first held in 2007 and has become an annual fall event at Mitzpe Gvulot, near Kibbutz Gvulot in the western Negev. The three-day festival is held during October (coinciding with the end of the Sukkot holiday) and over the years has become the main festival for independent music in Israel.

Artists and ensembles that performed at the festival include Assaf Avidan, Lola Marsh,  A-WA,  Esther Rada, Geva Alon and Noga Erez.

See also
Music of Israel
Culture of Israel

References 

Music festivals established in 2007
Music festivals in Israel